The Royal Waltz (German: Königswalzer) is a 1935 German musical film directed by Herbert Maisch and starring Paul Hörbiger, Curd Jürgens, and Carola Höhn.  It was shot at the Babelsberg Studios of UFA in Berlin. The film's sets were designed by the art directors Robert Herlth and Walter Röhrig. A separate French-language version  Royal Waltz was also released. It was remade in 1955 under the same title.

Synopsis
In 1852 an Austrian count is sent to Munich to arrange the marriage between his master Emperor Franz Joseph and the Princess Elisabeth, the daughter of the King of Bavaria.

Cast

References

Bibliography
 Klaus, Ulrich J. Deutsche Tonfilme: Jahrgang 1931. Klaus-Archiv, 2006.
 Reimer, Robert C. & Reimer, Carol J. Historical Dictionary of German Cinema. Rowman & Littlefield,  2019.
 Von Dassanowsky, Robert. Screening Transcendence: Film Under Austrofascism and the Hollywood Hope, 1933-1938. Indiana University Press, 2018
 Waldman, Harry. Nazi Films in America, 1933-1942. McFarland, 2008.

External links

1935 films
1930s historical musical films
German historical musical films
Films of Nazi Germany
1930s German-language films
Films directed by Herbert Maisch
Films set in the 1850s
German multilingual films
German black-and-white films
Cultural depictions of Empress Elisabeth of Austria
Cultural depictions of Franz Joseph I of Austria
UFA GmbH films
1935 multilingual films
Films set in the Austrian Empire
1930s German films
Films shot at Babelsberg Studios